Drabeši is a village in Drabeši Parish, Cēsis Municipality in the Vidzeme region of Latvia.

References

Towns and villages in Latvia
Cēsis Municipality
Kreis Wenden
Vidzeme